Radio Srebrenik is a Bosnian local public radio station, broadcasting from Srebrenik, Bosnia and Herzegovina.

It was launched on 29 November 1971 by the municipal council of Srebrenik. In Yugoslavia and in SR Bosnia and Herzegovina, it was part of local/municipal Radio Sarajevo network affiliate. This radio station broadcasts a variety of programs such as news, music, morning and talk shows. Program is mainly produced in Bosnian language.

Estimated number of potential listeners of Radio Srebrenik in Tuzla Canton area is around 211.782. Radio station is also available in municipalities of Tuzla Canton, Zenica-Doboj Canton and in Bosanska Posavina and online via internet.

Frequencies
 Srebrenik 
 Tuzla

See also 
List of radio stations in Bosnia and Herzegovina
Radio Gračanica
Radio Tuzla

References

External links 
 www.radiosrebrenik.ba
 Communications Regulatory Agency of Bosnia and Herzegovina
Mass media in Srebrenik
Srebrenik
Radio stations established in 1971